In algebraic geometry, the smooth completion (or smooth compactification) of a smooth affine algebraic curve X is a complete smooth algebraic curve which contains X as an open subset.  Smooth completions exist and are unique over a perfect field.

Examples
An affine form of a hyperelliptic curve may be presented as  where  and  has distinct roots and has degree at least 5. Nonetheless, the affine curve can be embedded in a unique compact Riemann surface called its smooth completion.

This smooth completion can also be obtained as follows. Project the affine curve to the affine line using the x-coordinate. Embed the affine line into the projective line, then take the normalization of the projective line in the function field of the affine curve.

Applications
A smooth connected curve over an algebraically closed field is called hyperbolic if  where g is the genus of the smooth completion and r is the number of added points.

Over an algebraically closed field of characteristic 0, the fundamental group of X is free with  generators if r>0.

(Analogue of Dirichlet's unit theorem) Let X be a smooth connected curve over a finite field. Then the units of the ring of regular functions O(X) on X is a finitely generated abelian group of rank r -1.

Construction
Suppose the base field is perfect. Any affine curve X is isomorphic to an open subset of an integral projective (hence complete) curve. Taking the normalization (or blowing up the singularities) of the projective curve then gives a smooth completion of X.  Their points correspond to the discrete valuations of the function field that are trivial on the base field.

By construction, the smooth completion is a projective curve which contains the given curve as an everywhere dense open subset, and the added new points are smooth. Such a (projective) completion always exists and is unique.

If the base field is not perfect, a smooth completion of a smooth affine curve doesn't always exist. But the above process always produces  a regular completion if we start with a regular affine curve (smooth varieties are regular, and the converse is true over perfect fields). A regular completion is unique and, by the valuative criterion of properness, any morphism from the affine curve to a complete algebraic variety extends uniquely to the regular completion.

Generalization
If X is a separated algebraic variety, a theorem of Nagata says that X can be embedded as an open subset of a complete algebraic variety. If X is moreover smooth and the base field has characteristic 0, then by Hironaka's theorem X can even be embedded as an open subset of a complete smooth algebraic variety, with boundary a normal crossing divisor. If X is quasi-projective, the smooth completion can be chosen to be projective.

However, contrary to the one-dimensional case, there is no uniqueness of the smooth completion, nor is it canonical.

See also
Hyperelliptic curve
Bolza surface

References

Bibliography

 (see chapter 4).

Algebraic geometry
Riemann surfaces
Algebraic curves
Birational geometry